Velutia is a genus of beetles in the family Buprestidae, containing the following species:

 Velutia amplicollis Cobos, 1976
 Velutia elegantula Cobos, 1976
 Velutia sericea Kerremans, 1900
 Velutia zischkai (Cobos, 1961)

References

Buprestidae genera